Mage Yalu Malu is a 2015 Sri Lankan Sinhala children's drama film co-directed by Lal Priyadewa and Sudesh Wasantha Pieris and produced by Janitha Marasinghe for Janitha Films. It stars kid Lithum Marasinghe and singer Chillie Thilanka in lead roles along with Chandani Seneviratne and Sarath Chandrasiri. Music composed by Edward Jayakody. It is the 1220th Sri Lankan film in the Sinhala cinema. The sequel to the film Yalu Malu Yalu 2 was released in 2018.

Film has two separate plots. The film revolves around a little boy, who has a relationship with a dolphin, and also a young man comes from abroad and lives secretly to his brother. the film successfully marked 50 days in silver screen.

Plot

Cast
 Lithum Marasinghe as Lithum Sukiri
 Chandani Seneviratne as Sukiri's Granny
 Chillie Thilanka as Sanjaya
 Sarath Chandrasiri as Driver
 D.B. Gangodathenna as Jayakody
 Jeevan Handunnetti as Chaminda
 Denuwan Senadhi as Kasun
 Piumi Boteju as Kaveesha's mother

Soundtrack

References

2015 films
2010s Sinhala-language films
Sri Lankan drama films